is an action role-playing game for the Wii developed by Namco Bandai Games in co-operation with Tri-Crescendo. The game was released by Namco Bandai Games in Japan on January 22, 2009. It was later published by Xseed Games in North America on March 16, 2010, and in Europe by Rising Star Games on March 19, 2010, followed by its release in Australia on October 7, 2010.

Gameplay
In Fragile Dreams, the player character, Seto, must traverse the ruins of Tokyo and the surrounding areas, fighting off ghosts that lurk within these ruins. The game's heads-up display includes a mini-map and HP gauge for Seto's location and health, respectively. Seto will fall unconscious if his HP reaches zero, resulting in a game over. The player controls Seto from a third-person perspective with the Wii Remote and Nunchuk. Seto can use his flashlight (controlled by the Wii Remote pointer) to illuminate his surroundings or solve puzzles and interact with the environment. When searching for certain objectives or hidden enemies, pointing Seto's light in their direction picks up and plays their sounds through the Wii Remote's mini speaker. The Wii Nunchuk, meanwhile, directly controls Seto's movement: aside of basic movement, he can crouch to hide and crawl through small spaces. Seto will often come across damaged floors, which require slow movement (and for heavily-damaged floors, crouching) to cross without falling through.

As Seto, the player can use weapons found throughout the world to fight off ghosts, ranging from slingshots and golf clubs to crossbows and katanas. Each weapon can only take a certain amount of use: once a weapon reaches its limit, it will break after battle. The player can also find other usable and collectable items in the field, marked with fireflies. The player can only save their game by resting at small fire pits scattered throughout the world: used fire pits are marked with a bonfire. The player can also examine and identify Mystery Items, organize their inventory, as well as after encountering the Merchant, buy and sell items.

As stated by the producer of the game, Kentarō Kawashima, Fragile Dreams is not strictly a survival horror: rather, its story focuses on human drama. In Fragile Dreams, aside of the main story, the player can find and examine objects and graffiti throughout the world. Objects called memory items (ranging from origami and stones to cell phones and books) hold the memories of their former owners (only accessible at bonfires), while the graffiti contains messages only seen by pointing at them in first-person. By examining these messages, the player can piece together hints to the game's backstory.

Story

Setting and characters
Fragile Dreams is set in a post-apocalyptic version of Earth in the near-future. Almost all the world's population has vanished, leaving the surviving buildings and structures abandoned. The game is set in and near the ruins of Tokyo, Japan, where the event that nearly wiped out humanity may have originated.

The protagonist, Seto, is a 15-year-old boy who searches the world for other living humans. He encounters Ren, a silver-haired girl who often leaves behind large, cryptic drawings. Other characters include: Sai, the ghost of a young woman; Crow, a mischievous and straightforward amnesiac boy; Personal Frame (P.F.), a portable computer who loves having conversations more than anything else; Chiyo, the ghost of a little girl; and the Merchant, a mysterious yet merry man who trades various goods. The game's host of enemies mainly consist of ghosts, but also include humanoid robots and security proxies. The main antagonist, Shin, is the AI of a scientist who considers speech to be an inferior means of communication. Various memory items include a greater set of characters, each giving hints to the game's backstory.

Plot
At the end of Seto's fifteenth summer, his grandfather dies. Seto buries him in front of their home, an old observatory, and that from then on he became "truly alone". At night, he searches for anything the old man had left for him and discovers a letter, along with a strange blue stone in a locket. Suddenly, a mask-like ghost appears and attacks Seto. After driving the creature off, Seto reads the old man's letter, who tells him to "reach a tall red tower" east of the observatory, where he might find other survivors.

After departing for the tower, Seto reaches an old subway entrance in the Azabudai district and finds Ren sitting on a collapsed pillar, singing to the stars. He accidentally startles her and the frightened Ren flees into the subway station: getting over the shock of meeting another person, Seto follows her. While searching the station, he discovers a Personal Frame, who guides him towards Ren. Unfortunately, just as they reach the exit, P.F.'s battery dies out: Seto buries the device, keeping a screw from it in his locket.

From the underground, Seto finds himself at an abandoned amusement park and encounters Crow, who steals Seto's locket. After a long chase across the park and another encounter with the masked ghost, Crow returns Seto's locket and directs him to a hotel nearby, where he saw a girl who might know something about Ren. Crow also gives Seto his skull ring to keep in his locket and kisses him. At the hotel, Seto encounters Sai and fights the masked ghost again. After laying to rest the spirit of an old woman named Chiyo, the two discover Ren's drawings by a sewer. Returning to the underground, Seto and Sai find themselves at a hydropower dam. While searching for Ren, Seto discovers that Crow is actually a robot, but his battery begins to fail and Seto mourns for him as he "die[s]". Finally, they encounter Ren in a cell: although glad to see him again, Ren runs off after Shin calls.

Sai explains to Seto that most of humanity died because of a "human empathy expansion project" called Glass Cage. The project was meant to make human thoughts transparent, meaning that no one would need words to communicate. However, after Glass Cage activated, people who went to sleep never woke up again. Sai reveals that she was Glass Cage's first catalyst: this time, Shin intends to use Ren as the catalyst. After exiting the dam, a demolition crane attempts to destroy it. Hearing both Shin's and the masked ghost's voices from the crane — saying, "Any threat to the project must be eliminated." — the player realizes both are manifestations of Glass Cage. After Seto destroys the crane, Sai leads him to the facility where Ren was taken to.

Entering the laboratory, Seto and Sai are confronted by Shin, who coldly dismisses Sai's attempts at reasoning with him and is adamant about proceeding with his plans. As they traverse the laboratory, they overhear a voice announcing "Glass Cage Launch Preparations Complete", strengthening their resolve to save Ren. Making it into the room where Ren is being held, Shin tells them of his intention to use Glass Cage to "obliterate corporeal beings". After Seto defeats him, Shin disappears and Seto releases Ren from the device holding her. Their reunion is cut short as Sai tells them that the backup system has "finished copying her psyche to the AI", allowing Glass Cage to proceed. Ren reveals Shin has escaped to the top of the Tokyo Tower and Seto asks Ren to wait at the base of the tower and for Sai to accompany her.

On his way up the tower, Seto hears the voices of P.F., Chiyo and Crow wishing him luck. He confronts and defeats Shin a second time, who reveals his motivations: he had secretly used himself as the first test subject of the human empathy expansion project and gained the ability to hear the thoughts of those around him. Despite his initial belief in the project as a way for humans to empathize with one another, all he heard around him was "jealousy and contempt" and he soon grew disillusioned with the world as even his parents turned against him. Believing no person loved him, Shin wants to put an end to humanity. His words meet with a vehement response from Sai, as she tells him that she loves him, having developed those feelings while she was the catalyst and all she ever wanted was to be part of his life. Hearing this, Shin finds peace, tossing the AI mainframe away so Glass Cage can never be reactivated and vanishes together with Sai, hand-in-hand, after thanking Seto.

Descending from the tower, Seto finally learns Ren's name and they resolve to look for other survivors together.

Development
Fragile Dreams was developed by the team at Namco Bandai Games. Director and producer Kentarō Kawashima came up with the concept for the game in 2003, before the Wii console was revealed. When the Wii was unveiled, it became the obvious choice as the game's platform as the Wii remote could be used to control the flashlight. Kawashima wrote the main scenario for the title, with the rest of the events being handled by sub-scenario writer Gingitsune. Additionally, Fragile Dreams includes 22 short stories conceived by 19 different writers, some of which were fans of the game. The sound of the title was carefully designed to coincide with the game's environments. The game's music, composed by Riei Saitō, was built around the game's ruined atmosphere. The theme song and ending theme,  and  respectively, were performed by Aoi Teshima.

In an interview with IGN concerning the English localization of the game, Xseed stated that they will attempt to give players a dual-language option in addition to new content for the North American release. Fragile Dreams did indeed contain both dubs. Actual game content was not changed, as Xseed aims to "keep the original creator’s vision intact as much as possible."

Reception

Fragile Dreams sold 26,055 copies during its week of release in Japan, making it the 2nd best-selling game of the week.

The game received "average" reviews according to the review aggregation website Metacritic. The substantial amount of criticism came from the game's gameplay, with many reviews stating the game had style over substance. Matt Casamassina of IGN said, "Fragile Dreams is a great example of a spectacular concept whose execution could have used a little more thought and time." Eurogamer echoed IGNs sentiments, noting "Fragile Dreams fails to match its ambition with its systems and imagination." In Japan, Famitsu gave it a score of three eights and one seven for a total of 31 out of 40.

GameZone'''s Michael Lafferty gave the game a much more positive write up, stating that "[w]hile the story is intriguing, what really brings this game home are the beautiful graphics and amazing audio. The emotional elements – like a haunting loneliness that pervades the world, the despair resonating in the voices of the characters – are clearly in place and Fragile Dreams' development team, Tri-Crescendo, has found the right mix for a game that is truly a wonderful experience." He added, "Fragile Dreams: Farewell Ruins of the Moon'' is a game that goes beyond genre descriptions, creating an experience that is remarkable."

References

External links

 
 

2009 video games
Abandoned buildings and structures in fiction
Action role-playing video games
Artificial intelligence in fiction
Bandai Namco games
Namco games
Fragile Dreams
Extinction in fiction
Fragile Dreams
Experimental medical treatments in fiction
Laboratories in fiction
Mass murder in fiction
Orphans in fiction
Video games about the paranormal
Post-apocalyptic video games
Video games about robots
Role-playing video games
Video games about spirit possession
Tri-Crescendo games
Video games developed in Japan
Video games about revenge
Video games set in Japan
Video games set in Tokyo
Wii games
Wii-only games
Rising Star Games games
Single-player video games
Xseed Games games